Daphna Dove (born 14 July 1975 in Hamburg, Germany) is an American musician.  She is best known for her appearance on the TV Show Rock Star: INXS.

Early life
Daphna was born in Germany in 1975 and raised in New York City, to which she moved at age 3 with her parents, Jewish-Israeli-German singer-mother Elisa Gabbai and her Jewish-Yugoslavian-German father Nico Anducic, who is credited with having discovered the band Scorpions. Although she graduated from Syracuse University with a double major in Communications and International Relations, Daphna resolved to pursue a music career, and moved to Los Angeles for that purpose.  In Los Angeles, Daphna played with the band Lexington and worked as a legal secretary until her successful audition for the TV Show Rock Star: INXS, in which INXS was looking for a new lead singer.

Rock Star: INXS
Daphna was one of the 15 finalists chosen for the chance to front rock group INXS. In the première Concert, Daphna performed "One Way or Another" by Blondie. INXS found that her tone and pitch were really good and moved her on to the next round. The next 2 two weeks Daphna performed steady performances of "People are Strange" by The Doors and "I Hate Myself For Loving You" by Joan Jett. It was on the third week when Daphna performed "Rock the Casbah" by The Clash that Daphna was placed in the Bottom 3 by the American public. Daphna sang the INXS hit "What You Need" for her elimination performance. Daphna was then eliminated along with Heather Luttrell in a double elimination.

After INXS
Since the show ended, Daphna has continued her music career as well as studying music therapy. Daphna has pushed aside the rock 'n' roll image and now positions herself as a spiritual singer/healer. Her music is an ambient/alternative mix.

References

External links
 [https://  www.        discogs.com/artist/864194-Daphna-Dove Daphna], Discography, Discogs.
 Rock Star: INXS page
 Daphna Dove on Myspace

American rock musicians
1975 births
Living people
Syracuse University alumni
German emigrants to the United States
Jewish American musicians
Jewish rock musicians
21st-century American Jews